Salvatore Rossini  (born 13 July 1986) is an Italian volleyball player, a member of the Italy men's national volleyball team and Italian club Azimut Modena. He was silver medalist of the 2016 Ummer Olympics and of the 2015 World Cup, and medalist of the European Championship (silver in 2013, bronze in 2015).

Career

National Team 
He debuted with the Italy men's national volleyball team in 2012. In 2013 Italy, including Rossini, won bronze medal of World League. In the same year he achieved silver medal of European Championship. In 2014 he and his Italian teammates won bronze of World League held in Florence, Italy. He was also part of the team that won the silver medal in the 2016 Summer Olympics and in the 2017 FIVB Volleyball Men's World Grand Champions Cup.

Sporting achievements

Clubs

National championships
 2014/2015  Italian Cup, with Modena Volley
 2015/2016  Italian SuperCup, with DHL Modena
 2015/2016  Italian Cup, with DHL Modena
 2015/2016  Italian Championship, with DHL Modena

National team
 2013  FIVB World League
 2013  CEV European Championship
 2014  FIVB World League
 2015  FIVB World Cup
 2015  CEV European Championship
 2016  Olympic Games

Individual
 2014 FIVB World League - Best Libero

External links
LegaVolley player profile

1986 births
Living people
People from Formia
Italian men's volleyball players
Modena Volley players
Olympic volleyball players of Italy
Volleyball players at the 2016 Summer Olympics
Medalists at the 2016 Summer Olympics
Olympic silver medalists for Italy
Olympic medalists in volleyball
Liberos
Sportspeople from the Province of Latina